Argüelles or Arguelles may refer to the following.

Places 
 Argüelles (Madrid), a ward in Madrid, Spain
Argüelles (Madrid Metro), a station on Line 3, 4 and 6
 Pabellón Polideportivo Municipal Fernando Argüelles, an arena in Antequera, Spain

People 
Argüelles is a Spanish surname. As with other such surnames, it is often written without diacritics as Arguelles.
 Agustín Argüelles (1776–1844), Spanish liberal politician and lawyer
 Alexander Argüelles (born 1964), American linguist
 Angélica Argüelles Kubli (born 1963), Mexican graphic designer
 Arael Argüelles (born 1987), Cuban footballer
 Bartolomé de Argüelles (16th century), lieutenant treasurer and co-interim governor of La Florida
 Carlos Arguelles (1917–2008), Filipino architect
 Consuelo Argüelles Loya (born 1977), Mexican National Action Party politician
 Emil Arguelles (born 1972), Belizean lawyer and politician, Speaker of the House of Representatives
 Faustino Rodríguez-San Pedro y Díaz-Argüelles (1833–1925), Spanish politician, Mayor of Madrid
 Fulgencio Argüelles (born 1955), Spanish writer and psychologist
 Ivan Argüelles (born 1939), American poet
 Jacqueline Argüelles (born 1968), Mexican Green Party politician
 John Arguelles (20th century), American lawyer, Associate Justice of the Supreme Court of California
 José Argüelles (1939–2011), American New Age author and artist
 José Canga Argüelles (1770–1843), Spanish politician, Minister of Finance
 Juan Antonio Arguelles Rius (1978–2007), also known as Arguru or Argu, Spanish music software programmer and musician
 Juan de Argüelles (1659–1712), Peruvian priest, Bishop of Arequipa, and Bishop of Panama
 Julian Argüelles (born 1966), English jazz saxophonist
 Manuel Argüelles Argüelles (1875–1945), Spanish politician and lawyer, Minister of Finance, Minister of Public Works
 María Argüelles Arellano (born 1963), Mexican National Action Party politician
 Martín de Argüelles (born 1566), first white person to have been born in what is now the United States
 Marco Argüelles (born 1989), Mexican footballer
 Noel Argüelles (born 1990), Cuban baseball pitcher
 Pedro Argüelles Morán (born 1943), pseudonym Pedro del Sol, Cuban cartographer, journalist, and human rights activist
 Ramon Arguelles (born 1944), Filipino priest, Archbishop of the Metropolitan Diocese of Lipa
 Steve Argüelles (born 1963), English jazz drummer
 Yarianny Arguelles (born 1984), Cuban track-and-field athlete specializing in long jump